Elaine H. Zackai is a Professor of Pediatrics, Director of Clinical Genetics, and the Director of the Clinical Genetics Center at Children's Hospital of Philadelphia (CHOP).

Biography
She was born in Brooklyn in 1943, to a metallurgist and a high school teacher.

Zackai completed her B.A. at the New York University College of Arts & Science in 1964, followed by her M.D. at New York University School of Medicine in 1968.

She is a member of multiple professional organisations, sits on multiple academic and institutional committees, and holds multiple professorships.

She is also a founding Fellow of the American College of Medical Genetics and Genomics.

Research
Her research has included genetic factors relating to birth defects, syndromes relating to chromosomal translocation, and 22q gene deletion.

Awards and honours
 1991 - Fellow, College of Physicians of Philadelphia
 2002 - Blockley-Osler Award
 2003 - Letitia and Alice Scott Endowed Chair in Genetics and Molecular Biology
 2007 - Master Clinician Award, Children's Hospital of Philadelphia
 2015 - Distinguished Alumni Award, Children's Hospital of Philadelphia
 2016 - American Society of Human Genetics Mentorship Award
 2022 - American College of Medical Genetics and Genomics Foundation for Genetic and Genomic Medicine's David L. Rimoin Lifetime Achievement Award in Medical Genetics

Selected publications
 22q11.2 deletion syndrome, Nature Reviews Disease Primers volume 1, Article number: 15071 (2015), 
 PTEN Mutation Spectrum and Genotype-Phenotype Correlations in Bannayan-Riley-Ruvalcaba Syndrome Suggest a Single Entity With Cowden Syndrome, Human Molecular Genetics, Volume 8, Issue 8, August 1999, Pages 1461–1472, 
 Nonlethal presentations of CYP26B1-related skeletal anomalies and multiple synostoses syndrome, 2021,

References

External links

Living people
American women scientists
American pediatricians
New York University alumni
American geneticists
Year of birth missing (living people)